Max Wirth (born 9 September 1930) is a Swiss former cyclist. He competed in the 4,000 metres team pursuit event at the 1952 Summer Olympics.

References

External links
 

1930 births
Possibly living people
Swiss male cyclists
Olympic cyclists of Switzerland
Cyclists at the 1952 Summer Olympics
Cyclists from Zürich